is a Japan-exclusive beat 'em up video game for the Super Famicom which was released in 1994.

Background
UFO Kamen Yakisoban was the main character, played by Michael Tomioka, in a series of TV commercials for "UFO" instant yakisoba noodles produced by Nissin Foods. A feature film was released in 1994 directly to VHS video, which also featured Dave Spector as Kettler. The theme from the movie, sung by Hironobu Kageyama, was released on a CD single.

Video game
The video game has two versions, one with a drawing on the cover and another with pictures of the actors, changing only the end of the name of the game from one version to another. The noodle superhero wants to marry the princess, but Kettler wants her for himself. The hero wears a bowl of  UFO yakisoba on his head. There are five stages to overcome until the princess can be rescued.

See also

 Mayuko Takata

References

External links
 Complete game overview at Giant Bomb
 Fan review at videogameden.com
 Fan review at rvgfanatic.com
 Japanese review 
 Nissin official site (North America)

1994 video games
Advergames
Beat 'em ups
Den'Z games
Japan-exclusive video games
KID games
Side-scrolling video games
Superhero video games
Super Nintendo Entertainment System games
Super Nintendo Entertainment System-only games
Video games about food and drink
Video games developed in Japan